Miriam Leder (born January 26, 1952) is an American film and television director and producer  noted for her action films and use of special effects. She was the first female graduate of the AFI Conservatory, in 1973. She has won 2 Emmy Awards and received nominations for 10 Emmy awards.

Early life
Leder was born in New York City in 1952, the daughter of Etyl, a classical pianist, and Paul Leder, a director, producer, actor, writer, and editor of such films as My Friends Need Killing, Attack of the Giant Horny Gorilla, and Dismember Mama. Leder was raised in Los Angeles in a Jewish household. Her mother is a Holocaust survivor from Brussels, Belgium, who was interned at Auschwitz. During childhood, her father, a low-budget independent filmmaker, introduced Mimi and her siblings to film production. Her father often dropped her off at the cinema to watch the latest films. Leder states that one of the early films that had an impact on her was Federico Fellini's 8½. She was the first woman accepted into the AFI Conservatory, where she studied cinematography.

Film career
Leder began her career as a script supervisor on a string of films, including Spawn of the Slithis (1978), Dummy (1979), The Boy Who Drank Too Much (1980), and A Long Way Home (1980), and then moved to the TV series Hill Street Blues (1981). After making the short film Short Order Dreams, written and funded by her father Paul, she screened it for Steven Bochco, creator of Hill Street Blues, and his friend Gregory Hoblit who hired her to direct an episode of L.A. Law.

In 1988, Leder directed episodes of Crime Story, The Bronx Zoo, Midnight Caller, then directed several episodes of China Beach (1988–91) for which she was nominated for four Emmys. She made the made-for-TV films Woman with a Past (1992), House of Secrets (1993), and Baby Brokers (1994), then became one of the core directors for ER (1994–2009). The show earned her Emmy Awards for Outstanding Drama Series in 1995 and 1996. She returned to direct an episode of the series during its final season in 2009. She soon received a job offer from Steven Spielberg to direct the film The Peacemaker (1997).

Continuing to work for DreamWorks, she directed Deep Impact (1998) and Pay It Forward (2000) while simultaneously creating Sentimental Journey (1999), a personal love story about her parents. When asked for a reaction about her film Deep Impact (1998) vs. a rival movie release at the same time Armageddon (1998), she responded: “Michael Bay did come to my premiere, which really shocked me. And I can tell you that after — after [seeing] my film — he went and reshot the end of his.” After making Pay It Forward Leder went through a period where she wasn't hired to direct any feature films.  “Most women who don’t have commercial success are not asked back to the party. It did not hurt me in television, but it did in features.”  Leder felt as though she had been put into a "movie jail" by Hollywood for the lack of success of Pay It Forward.

Leder's dry spell of feature films after the release of Pay It Forward drove her to other pursuits in television and film. She shot nine pilots and produced six series, including The Beast (2001), John Doe (2002), Johnny Zero (2005), and Vanished (2006). Leder also made many made-for-TV movies such as Thick as Thieves (2009), U.S. Attorney (2009), and Heavenly (2011). In 2015, Leder was brought by HBO to direct a first-season episode of The Leftovers and later hired as a co-showrunner.

Leder's feature film On the Basis of Sex, the story of Ruth Bader Ginsburg's path to become a U.S. Supreme Court Justice, was released in December 2018. It was Leder's first theatrical feature in 18 years.

Personal life
Leder has one daughter, Hannah, with her husband actor Gary Werntz. Leder states she "was raised a feminist" and "was an anti-war protester all during the Vietnam War".

Filmography

Feature films

Television
TV Movies

TV Series

Awards and nominations

Bibliography 
 Scott, Tobias. “Veteran TV Director Still Tries to Scale Film Barriers.” New York Times (10/13/2015): C2. Accessed November 13, 2018
 Brodesser, Claude. “Helmer: Leder Among Men.” Daily Variety (6/9/2000): A4. Accessed November 13, 2018
 Goldman, Michael. “Mimi Leger: Director.” Millimeter (Nov 1998) Accessed November 13, 2018
 Rochlin, Margy. “For Mimi Leder, Persistence Pays Off.” Directors Guild of America Quarterly (Spring 2018) Accessed November 14, 2018

References

External links
 
 The Paley Center for Media: https://web.archive.org/web/20150924101220/http://www.shemadeit.org/meet/biography.aspx?m=38
Mimi Leder DGA 

1952 births
Living people
AFI Conservatory alumni
Film producers from New York (state)
20th-century American Jews
American television directors
Television producers from New York City
American women television producers
American women film directors
American women television directors
Jewish American film directors
Film directors from New York City
American women film producers
Emmy Award winners
21st-century American Jews
20th-century American women
21st-century American women